Nettlebed is a village and civil parish in Oxfordshire in the Chiltern Hills about  northwest of Henley-on-Thames and  southeast of Wallingford. The 2011 Census recorded a parish population of 727.

Archaeology
It is claimed that in the 17th century a "Palæolithic floor" was found in Nettlebed Common. Mesolithic flint microliths and cores have been found in the parish.

History
The earliest known records of the name "Nettlebed" are from the 13th century. The Inquisitiones post mortem record it as Netelbedde in 1252 and 1276. The name does mean a nettlebed: a place overgrown with nettles. Nettlebed village is on an ancient route through the Chiltern Hills between Henley on Thames and Wallingford, which for centuries was part of a trunk route between London and Oxford. The road between Henley and Wallingford was made into a turnpike in 1736 and ceased to be a turnpike in 1873. It is now classified as the A4130. Nettlebed's strategic position led to its having several pubs, inns and coaching inns. They included the White Hart, which is 17th-century, and the Bull Inn and Sun Inn, which are 18th-century. Only the White Hart in the High Street is still trading. 

Nettlebed had a sub-post office and general store in Watlington Street. It has now ceased trading and is a private house. In 2012 Thierry Kelaart and Patrick Heathcote-Amory, son of Sir Ian Heathcote-Amory were married at St Bartholomew's parish church. Michael Middleton acted as father of the bride and guests included the Duchess of Cambridge. The house at 25, High Street, also known as the Old Priest House, is a Grade II listed building. The building is probably 16th-century with an 18th-century front and 19th-century windows.

Parish church
The Church of England parish of Saint Bartholomew was originally a chapelry of the adjacent parish of Benson. There is a record of the Empress Matilda giving the benefice of Benson, including chapels at Nettlebed and Warborough, to the Augustinian Abbey at nearby Dorchester, Oxfordshire in about 1140. The Medieval church building was replaced in 1845–46 by the present Gothic Revival brick building, designed by a member of the Hakewill family of architects. The only surviving part of the previous church is the lower stages of the brick west tower, which seems to be 18th-century.

The church has some 20th-century stained glass windows, including two made in 1970 by John Piper and Patrick Reyntiens. One is the chancel east window, in which a central tree of life is flanked by fish on one side and butterflies on the other. The other is the baptistery south window in the south aisle. This shows a tree of life with birds perching in it including an owl, a hawk and a pheasant. The tower has a ring of six bells, all cast by Charles and George Mears of the Whitechapel Bell Foundry in 1846.

Pottery
Bricks, tiles and pottery were made in Nettlebed from the second half of the 14th century until the 1930s. In the 15th century Nettlebed supplied ceramic tiles to Abingdon Abbey and bricks to Stonor House. The name "Crocker End" means "Potter's End". One remaining brick "bottle kiln" is preserved in Nuffield. It may be 17th-century. It is a Grade II* listed building. In 1674, George Ravenscroft obtained from Nettlebed, the sand used in the making of the first flint glass.

Windmill
Nettlebed had what seems to have been the only smock mill in Oxfordshire. It used to be at Chinnor but was moved to a windier site at Nettlebed in about 1825. It was a slender octagonal building with four common sails and a fantail. It burned down in 1912.

Amenities

Nettlebed Folk Club
The village has a long-established and highly regarded folk club which holds concerts on Monday evenings from 8pm at The Village Club in Nettlebed High Street. The Folk Song Club is a volunteer run, non-profit organisation. It was founded in July 1975 at the Bull Inn. When Brakspear Brewery closed the Bull Inn in 1991, the club moved to its present venue, which has capacity for 200 people. Many notable singers and musicians have performed at the club. They include Martin Carthy, Fairport Convention, John Kirkpatrick, Ralph McTell, Show of Hands, Steeleye Span and Richard Thompson. The Club is also known for special performances such as its "Feast of Fiddles'" where a mix of leading national performers and local artists provide themed evenings. In 2002 the club won the BBC Radio 2 Folk Club of the Year Award.

Transport
Thames Travel bus route X38 links Nuffield with Wallingford and Oxford in one direction and Henley on Thames and Reading, Berkshire in the other. It stops on the A4130 main road at Nettlebed Green, near the brick kiln at the east end of the village. Buses run generally hourly from Mondays to Saturdays. There is no Sunday service.

Notable residents
Flemings
 Lucy Fleming, actress
 Peter Fleming, writer and traveller
 Celia Johnson, star of the 1945 film Brief Encounter (also Peter Fleming's wife)

Others
 Sir Ninian Stephen, Australian judge and later 20th Governor-General of Australia, born in Nettlebed to Scottish parents in 1923 and emigrated to Australia in 1940

See also
 Crocker End House – former rectory

Gallery

References

Bibliography

External links

Nettlebed Community

Civil parishes in Oxfordshire
Folk music venues
Music venues in Oxfordshire
Villages in Oxfordshire